John Frame may refer to:

 John Frame (theologian) (born 1939), American philosopher and Calvinist theologian
 John Frame (cricketer) (1733–1796), English cricketer
 John Frame (sculptor) (born 1950), American sculptor, photographer, composer and filmmaker
 John Frame (bishop) (1930–2017), Canadian bishop
 John W. Frame (1872–1932), provincial politician from Alberta, Canada